"Voice" is a song written and recorded by Japanese-American singer-songwriter Ai, released February 13, 2013, by EMI Music Japan. Produced by Uta and Ai, the song served as the theme song for the Japanese drama Yakō Kanransha.

Upon its release, "Voice" became one of Ai's best selling singles of the 2010s, peaking at number 2 on the Billboard Japan Hot 100 chart and number 13 on the Oricon Singles Chart. The song was certified Platinum by the Recording Industry Association of Japan (RIAJ) in 2014. Following EMI Music Japan's absorption into Universal Music Japan, "Voice" was Ai's final release under the record company.

Background 
In December 2012, EMI Music Japan announced Ai's new song "Voice" would serve as the theme song for the Japanese drama Yakō Kanransha. Ai herself confirmed the announcement during her Ai Christmas Dinner Show with Choir. EMI Japan also announced "Voice" would be released digitally on January 16, 2013 while a physical CD single would be released on February 13. A physical limited edition of "Voice" was announced additionally. The B-side track of the single, "For You" was used in a television commercial advertisement for Kubota.

Music video 
A music video was included on the limited CD of "Voice". In 2016, the music video was uploaded to Ai's Vevo channel on YouTube.

Commercial performance 
"Voice" debuted at number 46 on the Billboard Japan Hot 100 for the week of January 23, 2013. For the week of January 30, it jumped to number 26 before falling the next week to number 31. On February 13, "Voice" rose to number 13. For the week of February 20, "Voice" peaked at number 2 on the Japan Hot 100 with combined physical and digital sales.

On the Oricon charts, the physical release of "Voice" charted for 13 weeks, peaking at number 13. The song is currently Ai's fourth best selling single.

Track listing

Charts

Weekly charts

Year-end charts

Credits and personnel 
Credits adapted from Tidal and Moriagaro liner notes.

 Ai Uemura – songwriting, lead vocals, production
 Uta – production, programing, composition

 Matthew "Damario" Quinney – songwriting
 Joseph Macklin – songwriting
 Carlos "Los" Jenkins, David "Davix" Foreman – songwriting
 Dashawn "Happie" White – songwriting 
 Thomas "Tom Jack" Jackson – songwriting
 Fifty1 Fifty – production
 D.O.I – mixing
 Tom Coyne – mastering

Certifications

Release history

References 

2013 singles
2013 songs
EMI Music Japan singles
Ai (singer) songs
Songs written by Ai (singer)
Song recordings produced by Ai (singer)